Suburbiac is the second album released by indie rock band Dolour. It was released on October 29, 2002. The album was produced by Aaron Sprinkle and Shane Tutmarc.

Track listing
All songs by Shane Tutmarc (BMI)

"Menage a Trois"
"Suburbiac"
"So Done with You"
"A Billion Odd People"
"Iceland"
"Get Yourself Together"
"Highway Hypnosis"
"Rest Your Head"
"Chasing the Wrong Girl Home"
"Baggage"
"Too Old for Fantasy"

Musicians
 Shane Tutmarc - vocals, guitar, piano, synth, bass; drums (tracks 3, 4, 10)
 Aaron Sprinkle - guitar, synth, drum loops, vocals
 Phil Peterson - cello, string bass, trumpet, vocals

 Joey Sanchez - drums (tracks 1, 5)
 Noah Weaver - synth (track 3)
 Kevin Barrans - theremin (track 4)
 Paul Mumaw - drums (tracks 6, 9, 11)
 Jason Holstrom - saxophone (track 9)
 Peter Sali - mandolin (track 11)

References 

2002 albums
Dolour albums